Raúl Alfonsín (1927–2009), was the former President of Argentina.

Alfonsín may also refer to:
Ricardo Alfonsín (born 1951), politician and son of the former President of Argentina
Alfonsín (footballer) (born 1951), Spanish footballer and football manager

See also
Alfonsina (disambiguation)
Alfonsine, Italian comune
Alfonsino, species of fish
Alfonsine tables, astronomical table